Christina Kenworthy-Browne CJ is an English Roman Catholic Religious Sister who belongs to the Congregation of Jesus, as well as an academic, researcher and writer.

In 2009 at the opening of Bar Convent's Jubilee 400 Heritage Project, Sister Christina Kenworthy-Browne introduced a new edition of A Briefe Relation (1650), the oldest biography of Mary Ward, the founder of both the Sisters of Loreto and the Congregation of Jesus, inspired by the way of life of the Society of Jesus.

Career
In the 1960s and 1970s Sister Christina (as she was then called according to the custom of the Order) was a member of the IBVM community and taught Classics at St Mary's Convent school, Ascot for many years. She was a formidable scholar with considerable classroom presence.   Kenworthy-Browne was archivist and librarian at the Bar Convent in York, the oldest surviving convent in England. She also served as a director governor of St Mary's School Ascot. She is a member of the Catholic Record Society.

Kenworthy-Browne has researched the history of recusancy in Great Britain and participated at the Downside Abbey Conference on Recusant Archives and Remains from the Three Kingdoms (1560–1789).

Family
Sister Christina is the sister of John Anthony Kenworthy-Browne, also a historian and writer.

References

External links
 http://www.boydell.co.uk/02832247.HTM
 Twenty-Eighth Sunday of the Year: Year C

21st-century English Roman Catholic nuns
British archivists
British women academics
English antiquarians
Living people
Historians of the Catholic Church
Year of birth missing (living people)
Place of birth missing (living people)
20th-century English Roman Catholic nuns